Sthenias franciscanus is a species of beetle in the family Cerambycidae. It was described by James Thomson in 1865, originally spelled as "Sthenias franciscana". It is known from Laos, Malaysia, China, Borneo and Sumatra.

References

franciscanus
Beetles described in 1865